Frank Nuttall (24 September 1870 – 7 August 1943) was Archdeacon of Madras from 1922 to 1924.
 
Nuttall was born in Ilkeston. He was educated at Oakham School; and Sidney Sussex College, Cambridge. He was ordained in 1896. He served curacies at Hunslet and New Brighton. He was a chaplain in Madras from 1900 until 1924. Returning to England he was Vicar of Chevithorne from 1924 until his retirement in 1929.

References

19th-century English Anglican priests
20th-century Indian Anglican priests
People from Ilkeston
People educated at Oakham School
1870 births
1943 deaths
Alumni of Sidney Sussex College, Cambridge
Archdeacons of Madras